2012 U.S. Open may refer to:

2012 U.S. Open (golf), a major golf tournament
2012 US Open (tennis), a grand slam tennis event
2012 Lamar Hunt U.S. Open Cup, a soccer tournament for US teams